John Donald "Don" Larway (February 12, 1954 – November 9, 2019) was a professional ice hockey player who played 324 games in the World Hockey Association (WHA). He died in November 2019 in Houston, where he had resided for many years, working as a professional videographer for the Houston Aeros of the American Hockey League, Houston Rockets and Houston Astros. Nicknamed "Dart".

Playing career
Following two MJHL seasons with the Dauphin Kings, the Oak Lake, Manitoba native played two WCHL seasons, the first with the Winnipeg Jets and the second split between the Winnipeg Clubs and the Swift Current Broncos. Drafted 18th overall by the Boston Bruins, and third overall in the WHA by the Cincinnati Stingers, Larway spent his first four pro seasons with the Houston Aeros of the latter league.  He joined the Indianapolis Racers in 1978–79, spending half the season in the minors with the Rochester Americans. Larway's final year in major pro hockey was split between the Kalamazoo Wings and the Adirondack Red Wings.

Career statistics
                                            --- Regular Season ---  ---- Playoffs ----
Season   Team                        Lge    GP    G    A  Pts  PIM  GP   G   A Pts PIM
--------------------------------------------------------------------------------------
1969-70  Dauphin Kings               MJHL    0    0    0    0    0  --  --  --  --  --
1970-71  Dauphin Kings               MJHL   45   28   27   55  140  --  --  --  --  --
1971-72  Dauphin Kings               MJHL   40   26   29   55  123  --  --  --  --  --
1972-73  Winnipeg Jets               WCHL   67   35   31   66  147  --  --  --  --  --
1973-74  Winnipeg Clubs              WCHL   19    9    7   16   57  --  --  --  --  --
1973-74  Swift Current Broncos       WCHL   47   37   29   66  118  --  --  --  --  --
1974-75  Houston Aeros               WHA    76   21   14   35   59  13   3   1   4   8
1975-76  Houston Aeros               WHA    79   30   20   50   56  16   7   5  12  21
1976-77  Oklahoma City Blazers       CHL     2    1    0    1   17  --  --  --  --  --
1976-77  Houston Aeros               WHA    75   11   13   24  112   3   1   0   1   0
1977-78  Houston Aeros               WHA    69   24   35   59   52   6   1   2   3   4
1978-79  Rochester Americans         AHL    37   13   11   24   55  --  --  --  --  --
1978-79  Indianapolis Racers         WHA    25    8   10   18   39  --  --  --  --  --
1979-80  Kalamazoo Wings             IHL    12    3    3    6   16  --  --  --  --  --
1979-80  Adirondack Red Wings        AHL    48   12   15   27   15   5   1   1   2   0
--------------------------------------------------------------------------------------
         WHA Totals                        324   94   92  186  318  38  12   8  20  33

References

External links
Profile at hockeydraftcentral.com

1954 births
2019 deaths
Dauphin Kings players
Adirondack Red Wings players
Boston Bruins draft picks
Canadian ice hockey right wingers
Cincinnati Stingers draft picks
Ice hockey people from Manitoba
Indianapolis Racers players
Kalamazoo Wings (1974–2000) players
Houston Aeros (WHA) players
National Hockey League first-round draft picks
Oklahoma City Blazers (1965–1977) players
People from Westman Region, Manitoba
Rochester Americans players
Swift Current Broncos players
Winnipeg Clubs players
Winnipeg Jets (WHL) players
World Hockey Association first round draft picks
Canadian expatriate ice hockey players in the United States